Freiberg is a university and former mining town in Saxony, Germany. It is a so-called Große Kreisstadt (large county town) and the administrative centre of Mittelsachsen district.

Its historic town centre has been placed under heritage conservation and is a part of the UNESCO World Heritage Site known as the Ore Mountain Mining Region, due to its exceptional testimony to the development of mining techniques across many centuries. Until 1969, the town was dominated for around 800 years by the mining and smelting industries. In recent decades it has restructured into a high technology site in the fields of semiconductor manufacture and solar technology, part of Silicon Saxony. It is home of the oldest university of mining and metallurgy in the world – the Freiberg University of Mining and Technology.

Geography

Location 
The town lies on the northern declivity of the Ore Mountains, with the majority of the borough west of the Eastern or Freiberger Mulde river. Parts of the town are nestled in the valleys of Münzbach and Goldbach streams. Freiberg lies within a region of old forest clearances, subsequently used by the mining industry which left its mark on the landscape. The town is surrounded to the north, southeast and southwest by woods, and in the other directions by fields and meadows. Since the beginning of the 21st century an urbanised area has gradually developed which is formed by the towns of Nossen, Roßwein, Großschirma, Freiberg and Brand-Erbisdorf. It has currently about 75,000 inhabitants.

Freiberg lies on a boundary between two variants of the Upper Saxon dialect: the Southeast Meissen dialect (Südostmeißnisch) to the east and the South Meissen dialect (Südmeißnisch) to the west of the town, both belonging to the five Meissen dialects, as well as just north of the border of the dialect region of East Erzgebirgisch.

Expansion of the town 
The nucleus of the town, the former forest village of Christiansdorf lies in the valley of the Münzbach stream. The unwalled town centre grew up on its two slopes and on the ridge to the west. This means inter alia that the roads radiating outwards east of the old main road axis (today Erbische Straße and Burgstraße running from the former Erbisch Gate (Erbischer Tor) on Postplatz to Freudenstein Castle), some of which run as far as the opposite side of the Münzbach valley, are very steep. The area located east of the main road axis is called Unterstadt ("Lower Town"), with its lower market or Untermarkt. The western area is the Oberstadt ("Upper Town") where the Obermarkt or "Upper Market" is situated. The town centre is surrounded by a green belt running along the old town wall. In the west, this belt, in which the ponds of the Kreuzteichen are set, broadens out into an area like a park. Just north of the town centre, is Freudenstein Castle as well as the remnants of the town wall with several wall towers and Schlüsselteich pond in front of them. The remains of the wall run eastwards, in sections, to the Donats Tower. This area is dominated by the historic moat. The southern boundary of the old town is characterised in places by buildings from the Gründerzeit period. The B 101 federal road, here called Wallstraße, flanks the west of the town centre, the B 173, as Schillerstraße and Hornstraße, bounds it to the south.

Freiberg's north is dominated by the campus of its University of Mining and Technology. The main part of the campus on either side of Leipziger Straße (as the B 101 road, the most important transport link in this district) emerged in the 1950s and 1960s. Furthermore, the districts of Lossnitz, Lößnitz  and Kleinwaltersdorf are found here, extending almost out to the boundary of the borough. Between Kleinwaltersdorf and Lößnitz is the Nonnenwald wood, and east of Leipziger Straße is a trading estate.

Surrounding area 

In the area around Freiberg there are both industrial estates as well as agricultural and recreational areas. Smelting and metalworking firms are based at Muldenhütten and Halsbrücke and paper manufacturers at Weißenborn and Großschirma. Northeast of the town is the recreational area of the Tharandt Forest

The town of Großschirma lies north of Freiberg on the B 101 federal road. To the northeast the municipality of Halsbrücke borders on the territory of Freiberg's borough and, to the east, is the municipality of Bobritzsch-Hilbersdorf. The municipality of Weißenborn to the southeast belongs to the Verwaltungsgemeinschaft of Lichtenberg/Erzgebirge. On the B 101 south of Freiberg is the Große Kreisstadt of Brand-Erbisdorf and to the east is the municipality of Oberschöna.

Town subdivisions and residential areas

History

The town was founded around 1168, after a silver discovery led to the first Berggeschrey, and has been a centre of the mining industry in the Ore Mountains for centuries. A symbol of that history is the Freiberg University of Mining and Technology, often just known as the Mining Academy (Bergakademie), established in 1765 and the second oldest university of mining and metallurgy in the world (in North Hungary, in Selmecbánya town (now Banská Štiavnica, Slovakia), a Mining Academy was established at 1735). Freiberg also has a notable cathedral containing two famous Gottfried Silbermann organs. There are two other organs made by Gottfried Silbermann – one at the St. Peter's Church (Petrikirche) and the other one at the St. James' Church (Jakobikirche).

The renaissance part of Freiberg, built after a fire destroyed the town in 1484, stands under heritage protection.

In 1913, silver mining was discontinued due to the decline in the price of silver. Resumed before the Second World War, mining activities for lead, zinc and tin extraction continued until 1969.

In 1944, a subcamp of Flossenbürg concentration camp, was built outside the town of Freiberg.  It housed over 500 female survivors of other camps, including Auschwitz.  Altogether 50 or so SS women worked in this camp until its evacuation in April 1945. The female survivors eventually reached Mauthausen concentration camp in Austria.

In 1985, The Church of Jesus Christ of Latter-day Saints built the Freiberg Germany Temple here because of the large number of members in the region. The building of this temple is considered quite historic by church members given the political climate in Eastern Europe at the time. The Freiberg Germany Temple serves members of The Church of Jesus Christ of Latter-day Saints from all over Eastern Germany and a majority of Eastern Europe.

On 6 July 2019, the Erzgebirge/Krušnohoří Mining Region including Freiberg was inscribed as a UNESCO World Heritage Site.

Regular events 
Every year in Freiberg the Mining Town Festival (Bergstadtfest) is held on the last weekend in June with a procession by the historic Miners' and Ironworkers' Guilds, the so-called Miners' and Ironworkers' Parade. The Freiberg Christmas Market takes place during Advent, when a so-called Mettenschicht is held with a parade by the Miners' and Ironworkers' Guilds and the SAXONIA Miners Music Corps. This includes a traditional sermon on the mount in St. Peter's Church and waiting by the miners on the second Saturday in Advent. Firmly established is the potter's gathering on a weekend in the second half of April on the Upper Market (Obermarkt). Every year on the Drei Brüder Schacht mineshaft in the quarter of Zug there is a model steam engine gathering. Other annual events include the Freiberg Art Award and the election of the Mining Town Queen (Bergstadt-Königin).

Education
The Technische Universität Bergakademie Freiberg (Freiberg University of Mining and Technology or Freiberg Mining Academy, University of Technology) was established in 1765 by Prince Franz Xaver, regent of Saxony, based on plans by Friedrich Wilhelm von Oppel and Friedrich Anton von Heynitz, and is the oldest university of mining and metallurgy in the world.

 The Technische Universität Bergakademie Freiberg (Freiberg University of Mining and Technology or Freiberg Mining Academy, University of Technology) was established in 1765 by Prince Franz Xaver, regent of Saxony, based on plans by Friedrich Wilhelm von Oppel and Friedrich Anton von Heynitz, and is the oldest university of mining and metallurgy in the world.

Twin towns – sister cities

Freiberg is twinned with:

 Clausthal-Zellerfeld, Germany (1995)
 Darmstadt, Germany (1990)
 Delft, Netherlands (1986)
 Gentilly, France (1960)
 Ness Ziona, Israel (1996)
 Příbram, Czech Republic (1999)
 Wałbrzych, Poland (1999)

Freemen
 2000 Günter Blobel, biochemist, Nobel Prize 1999
 2014 Michael Federmann, investor

Notable people 

 Günter Bartusch (1943–1971), motorcycle racer
 August Bebel (1840–1913), politician
 Fritz Bleyl (1880–1966), architect, painter of Expressionism
 Günter Blobel (born 1936), biologist, Nobel laureate, sponsor of the reconstruction of neo-historic buildings in Saxony
 Kwasi Boakye (1827–1904), from Ashanti, Dutch mining engineer, student in Freiberg (also: Boachi)
 Rolf Emmrich (1910–1974), internist and university teachers
 Theodoric of Freiberg (c. 1250–c. 1311), theologian, philosopher and physicist who gave an accurate explanation for the rainbow
 Johann Friedrich August Breithaupt (1791–1873), mineralogist
 Leopold von Buch (1774–1853), geologist
 Hans Carl von Carlowitz (1645–1714), Saxon Oberberg Chief
 Christoph Demantius (1567–1643), composer
 Johann Wolfgang von Goethe (1749–1832), natural scientist, writer and statesman
 Alexander von Humboldt (1769–1859), naturalist and explorer
 Friedrich Robert Helmert (1843–1917), surveyor, mathematician, the Helmert transformation is named after him, it is the chi-squared distribution attributed
 Herbert Jobst (1915–1990), writer
 Edward Johnson (1840–1903), local historian and editor of the  Vogtländische Gazette 
 Helmut Kirchberg (1906–1983), mining scientist
 Theodor Körner (author) (1791–1813), poet, freedom fighter
 Wilhelm August Lampadius (1772–1842), metallurgist, chemist
 Friedrich Mohs (1773–1839), Mineralogist, creator of the Mohssche Härteskala 
 Carl Friedrich Naumann (1797–1873), geologist
 Novalis (1772–1801), poet
 Max Roscher (1888–1940), politician, Reichstag deputy
 Bernd Schröder (born 1942), football coach
 Clara Schumann (1819–1896), pianist
 Gottfried Silbermann (1683–1753), organ builders
 Alfred Wilhelm Stelzner (1840–1895), geologist
 Christian Heinrich Spiess (1755–1799), actor, playwright and author, co-founder of the Gothic novel
 Emil von Sydow (1812–1873), officer, geographer and cartographer
 André Tanneberger (born 1973), known as ATB, trance DJ
 Jakob Ullmann (born 1958), composer and university lecturer
 Robert Volkmann (1815–1883), composer
 Christian Leopold von Buch (1774–1853), geologist
 Bernhard von Cotta (1808–1879), geologist
 Kunz von Kaufungen (1410–1455), abductor of the Saxon Princes Albrecht and Ernst, executed in Freiberg
 Eberhard Wächtler (1929–2010), economic historian
 Julius Weisbach (1806–1871), mathematician and engineer
 Abraham Gottlob Werner (1749–1817), co-founder of the modern geoscience 
 Jacobo Benjamin Wiesner (1758–1842), metallurgist, expand the mining practices to Latin America, economic supporter of Colombian independence
 Clemens Winkler (1838–1904), chemist, discoverer of germanium
 Johann Heinrich Zedler (1706–1751), bookseller and publisher
 Gustav Zeuner (1828–1907), engineer

External links
Official website

Notes and references

Cziborra, Pascal. KZ Freiberg. Geheime Schwangerschaft. Lorbeer Verlag. Bielefeld. 2008.

External links

 
Towns in the Ore Mountains
Mittelsachsen
Mining communities in Germany